Maheswaram is a village and mandal in Ranga Reddy district in the state of Telangana, India.

Geography
Maheshwaram is at 17° 55'0N 79° 54' 0E.

Village agriculture mainly depends on rain water and ground water. The main crops cultivated are paddy, cotton, corn, chilli, turmeric, and ground nut.

Elections
T. Krishna Reddy of Telugu Desam Party won in the state legislative assembly elections in 2014. In the Telangana legislative assembly elections which were held in December 2018, the victor was Patlolla Sabitha.

Religion
There is a 400 year old Shiva Ganga temple, from which the village got its name.

The Qutb Shahi mosque displays considerable craftsmanship and is the grand mosque of Maheshwaram region.

Gadikota (Akkana madhanna kota) it is best spot to visit oldest construction of  kings guest house,

In this kota many film shooting were happen in  this area  movies like Raja, simharashi, Andrudu, dharuvu,  

new recently movie like bhangar raju(nagarjuna) 

thadaka. 

News  : v6 telangana songs like bhathukamma songs,

Silver screen entry songs : zee telugu 's(Radamma kuthuru, Agini pariksha)

References

Mandals in Ranga Reddy district
Villages in Ranga Reddy district

Sub Register Office Maheshwarm is available here.